The Amandas was an American reality television series on the Style Network. The series premiered on January 30, 2012. The Amandas follows home organizing expert Amanda LeBlanc, as she helps people turn cluttered spaces into usable areas.

Episodes

References

2010s American reality television series
2012 American television series debuts
2012 American television series endings
English-language television shows
Style Network original programming